Vladimir Ilyich Sharpatov (born March 21, 1940, Krasnogorkiy village of Zvenigovsky District, Mari El) is a civil aviation pilot and Hero of the Russian Federation (1996). An Ilyushin Il-76 cargo plane under his command made a forced landing at the airfield near Kandahar, Afghanistan, in August 1995. All seven Russian nationals on board were subsequently held captive by the Taliban for a year until they successfully escaped by flying their own plane out of Afghanistan in August 1996. Russian actor Alexander Baluyev played Vladimir Sharpatov in the 2010 film Kandagar.

Biography 

Sharpatov took evening classes at the Kazan Aviation Institute, and attended a local flying club, where he became a glider pilot.

External links 
  Sharpatov, Vladimir Ilyich
 Russian airmen escape from Afghanistan, Phil Reeves, The Independent, 19 August 1996
 Afghan Escape Film ‘Kandahar’ Pulls in Crowds, Alexander Bratersky, The St. Petersburg Times, February 9, 2010

1940 births
Living people
People from Zvenigovsky District
Heroes of the Russian Federation
A Just Russia politicians
21st-century Russian politicians